Protein geranylgeranyltransferase type I subunit beta is a protein that in humans is encoded by the PGGT1B gene.

Function

Protein geranylgeranyltransferase type I (GGTase-I) transfers a geranylgeranyl group to the cysteine residue of candidate proteins containing a C-terminal CAAX motif in which 'A' is an aliphatic amino acid and 'X' is leucine (summarized by Zhang et al., 1994 [PubMed 8106351]). The enzyme is composed of a 48-kD alpha subunit (FNTA; MIM 134635) and a 43-kD beta subunit, encoded by the PGGT1B gene. The FNTA gene encodes the alpha subunit for both GGTase-I and the related enzyme farnesyltransferase.[supplied by OMIM, Mar 2010].

References

Further reading